Amanda Coetzer was the defending champion but lost in the first round to Elena Tatarkova.

Mary Pierce won the final 6–0, 2–0 after Silvia Farina was forced to retire.

Seeds
A champion seed is indicated in bold text while text in italics indicates the round in which that seed was eliminated. The top two seeds received a bye to the second round.

  Nathalie Tauziat (semifinals)
  Mary Pierce (champion)
  Irina Spîrlea (quarterfinals)
  Amanda Coetzer (first round)
  Ai Sugiyama (quarterfinals)
  Anke Huber (quarterfinals)
  Iva Majoli (second round)
  Henrieta Nagyová (first round)

Draw

Final

Section 1

Section 2

External links
 ITF tournament edition details
 WTA tournament draws

SEAT Open
Luxembourg Open
1998 in Luxembourgian tennis